The Ambassador of Australia to Poland is an officer of the Australian Department of Foreign Affairs and Trade and the head of the Embassy of the Commonwealth of Australia to the Republic of Poland. The ambassador is located in Warsaw and also holds non-resident accreditation for Lithuania (since 2013) and the Czech Republic (and formerly Czechoslovakia, 1978–1990; since 1994). From 29 June 1990 to September 1994 there was a resident embassy in Prague. The current ambassador, since November 2019, is Lloyd Brodrick.

The Australian Government has maintained a diplomatic relationship with Poland since 1972. Between June 1972 and September 1973 the Australian Ambassador in Moscow was dually accredited to Warsaw. In 1973, Francis Stuart became the first resident Ambassador to the country.

Officeholders

Heads of mission

Notes
: Also served as non-resident Ambassador of Australia to Czechoslovakia, between 1978 and 1990.
: Also served as non-resident Ambassador of Australia to the Czech Republic, since 1994.
: Also served as non-resident Ambassador of Australia to the Republic of Lithuania, since 2013.

Resident Ambassadors to Czechoslovakia/Czech Republic

See also
 Australia–Lithuania relations
 Australia–Poland relations

References

External links
Australian Embassy, Poland – Czech Republic, Lithuania

 
 
 
 
Poland
Australia